Greatest Hits Radio Staffordshire & Cheshire is an Independent Local Radio station broadcasting from studios in Shelton, Stoke-on-Trent, to Staffordshire and Cheshire. The station was owned by Wireless Group and ran a "gold format" playlist. It's the sister station of Signal 1 and was based in the same studios.

History 

The station began as Signal Radio which first broadcast at 6 am, 5 September 1983, with DJ John Evington selecting Neil Diamond's "Beautiful Noise" as its first track. The station initially broadcast on 104.3 MHz and 1170 kHz (a wavelength of 257 metres, with the phrase "2 5 7" becoming a distinctive leitmotif), changing to 102.6 MHz soon after. The station's name is derived from "Signal" the name of the newspaper in Arnold Bennett's local novels.

In the late 1980s the Independent Broadcasting Authority ordered stations to provide different services on their FM and AM outputs. Due to this, in 1992 a "Golden Breakfast Show" started on the 1170 AM frequency while for the rest of the day it would take the main Signal Radio service. On 18 January 1993 a full-time station, Signal Gold, was launched.

In February 2019, Signal 2 was sold to Bauer Radio.

Technical
Signal 2's 1170 AM transmitter is at Sideway, near to the A500 D Road, just south of the A50 junction. It transmits 0.2 kW of power and can be heard throughout most of Staffordshire and Cheshire. This transmitter was closed in January 2023.

Signal 2 also broadcast on the local Stoke and Stafford DAB multiplex 12D, from transmitters at Alsagers Bank, Pye Green BT Tower, Sutton Common BT Tower and Tick Hill.

Programming
The majority of Greatest Hits Radio Staffordshire & Cheshire's programming was produced and presented from its Stoke-on-Trent studios. The nightly late show was simulcast with Wireless Group's AM and FM stations while a syndicated show from Chris Country Radio aired on Sunday afternoons.

Greatest Hits Radio Staffordshire & Cheshire broadcast local news bulletins hourly from 6 am to 6 pm on weekdays and from 8 am to 12 pm on weekends. Headlines were broadcast on the half-hour during weekday breakfast and drivetime shows, alongside thrice daily showbiz bulletins. The station also simulcast hourly Sky News Radio bulletins at all other times. Greatest Hits Radio Staffordshire & Cheshire also broadcast the bulk of Signal Radio's sports coverage, including live commentary on Stoke City matches and a weekly magazine show, Jumpers for Goalposts on Friday evenings.

See also 
Signal 1

References

External links 
 
 Sideway transmitter

Mass media in Stoke-on-Trent
Radio stations in Staffordshire
Radio stations established in 1992
Bauer Radio
Greatest Hits Radio